Ehsān Narāghi (2 February 1926 – 2 December 2012) was an Iranian sociologist, writer and Farah Pahlavi adviser

Biography
During his high school he went to Dar ol-Fonoon in Tehran. Then he studied sociology in the University of Geneva and received his PhD at Sorbonne University in Paris.

In Iran, he was a professor of sociology and director of the Social Studies and Research at the University of Tehran (Iran). As a sociologist, he has collaborated for many years in the work of international scientific associations. In 1965, he prepared for the United Nations the first worldwide study on the "Brain Drain". He has written widely on sociological issues in developing countries, and in 1970 he gave courses on youth, education and society in the Third World countries, at the University of Paris VIII: Vincennes—Saint-Denis.

After his experience of being jailed during the Islamic Revolution of Iran, he wrote his book "From Palace to Prison: Inside the Iranian Revolution".
He was the first major sociologist who investigated brain-drain phenomenon due to migration of the third world's best intellectuals to developed countries. Some of his works were featured in a chapter of a book by the Iranian Sociologist, Ali Mirsepassi in 
He was a member of UNESCO as a director of UNESCO's Youth Division for many years, and, after his retirement, as an advisor to the Director General of UNESCO until 1999.
He was the only Iranian who was awarded Légion d'honneur medal twice, once by De Gaulle, and then by Mitterrand. He died on 2 December 2012 after a long illness.

Works and Publications

See also 
 Intellectual movements in Iran
 University of Geneva
 National Council of Resistance in Iran

References

External links
 Books by Ehsan Naraghi and Complete Book Reviews- Publishers Weekly
 List of Naraghi's books - Thriftbooks

Iranian writers
Iranian sociologists
People from Kashan
University of Geneva alumni
University of Paris alumni
Academic staff of the University of Tehran
Academic staff of the University of Paris
1926 births
2012 deaths
Burials at Behesht-e Zahra
UNESCO officials
Recipients of the Legion of Honour
Iranian prisoners and detainees
Iranian officials of the United Nations